Cyril Geoffrey Edmund Harker  (17 November 1890 – 4 November 1970) was a New Zealand soldier, lawyer and politician of the National Party.

Biography

Harker was born at Havelock North and attended Napier Boys' High School. He graduated in 1915 from the Victoria College (now Victoria University of Wellington) with an LLB. He served in World War I in the New Zealand Expeditionary Force departing 13 June 1918  and rising to the rank of Company Sergeant Major. He returned in August 1919 and in that year bought a share of the law partnership in Waipawa that is now McKay Mackie. He was Mayor of Waipawa and held offices in both the Returned Services Association and the Chamber of Commerce.

In 1936 and 1937 he represented the abortion care provider Isabel Annie Aves, who was tried four times for 'using an instrument with the intent to procure a miscarriage.'  Neither the first trial in Napier in August 1936 nor the retrials in Wellington in October 1936, December 1936 and February 1937 resulted in the jury reaching a verdict. Harker's defence rested on lack of direct evidence; none of the women were gave evidence and the crown prosecutor relied on circumstantial evidence. In 1938 he also defended Colin Herbert Hercock who shot Aves after her return to the Hawkes Bay, getting him convicted of the lesser charge of manslaughter rather than murder and subsequently getting his prison term reduced.

His maiden speech to the house concerned the Small Farms Amendment Bill which dealt with the settlement and rehabilitation of returned soldiers. He was Chairman of Committees from 1950 to 1957.

In the 1964 Queen's Birthday Honours, Harker was appointed an Officer of the Order of the British Empire for public services. He died on 4 November 1970.

Notes

References

|-

New Zealand National Party MPs
1890 births
1970 deaths
Mayors of places in the Hawke's Bay Region
People educated at Napier Boys' High School
Victoria University of Wellington alumni
20th-century New Zealand lawyers
New Zealand military personnel of World War I
New Zealand Officers of the Order of the British Empire
Members of the New Zealand House of Representatives
New Zealand MPs for North Island electorates
20th-century New Zealand politicians